Chiraphos is a chiral diphosphine employed as a ligand in organometallic chemistry. This bidentate ligand chelates metals via the two phosphine groups. Its name is derived from its description — being both chiral and a phosphine. As a C2-symmetric ligand, chiraphos is available in two enantiomeric forms, S,S and R,R, each with C2 symmetry.

Preparation
Chiraphos is prepared from S,S or R,R-2,3-butanediol, which are derived from commercially available S,S or R,R-tartaric acid; the technique of using cheaply available enantiopure starting materials is known as chiral pool synthesis. The diol is tosylated and then the ditosylate is treated with lithium diphenylphosphide. The ligand was an important demonstration of how the conformation of the chelate ring can affect asymmetric induction by a metal catalyst.  Prior to this work, in most chiral phosphines, e.g., DIPAMP, phosphorus was the stereogenic center.

References

Diphosphines
Phenyl compounds